State Road 417 (SR 417), also known as the Central Florida GreeneWay, Seminole County Expressway (depending on the location), Eastern Beltway and Orlando East Bypass, is a tolled limited-access state highway forming the eastern beltway around the city of Orlando, Florida, United States.  It is owned and maintained by the Central Florida Expressway Authority (CFX) and Florida's Turnpike Enterprise. The CFX section was posthumously named after former Orlando Orange County Expressway Authority chairman Jim Greene.

SR 417 was originally planned to be a full beltway around Orlando.  Eventually, the beltway was divided, with the west side being designated SR 429, and the east side retaining the SR 417 designation. The two expressways will be non-continuous, until 2023, when SR 429 will be extended via  Wekiva Parkway to meet SR 417 in the Sanford/Heathrow area.

Route description
Although SR 417 is signed north-south throughout its entire route, it runs east-west between Celebration and CR 15. After the latter road, it runs north-south through the rest of its route.

The Southern Connector as well as the beltway begins at an interchange with I-4 in Celebration.

Between the International Drive interchange and the Orange–Seminole county line, the tollway is known as the Central Florida GreeneWay, and is operated by CFX.

The Seminole Expressway section of the tollway begins at the county line.

Tolls
There are six mainline toll plazas on the tollway and have at least one express lane dedicated to E-Pass/SunPass for electronic toll collection (ETC), which do not require motorists to stop at a booth, as well as lanes dedicated to cash collection.  The Celebration toll plaza has one ETC lane, and all of the others have at least two ETC lanes.  The ramp toll plazas have a lane dedicated to ETC and exact change only, with no change provided.

While both E-Pass and SunPass are accepted at all interchanges along the toll road, portions maintained by CFX are signed as E-Pass and portions maintained by FTE are signed as SunPass.

The current toll rates took effect in July 2012.

History

Phase I: The Eastern Beltway

The first phase of SR 417, then termed the Eastern Beltway, extended from what was the east end of the East–West Expressway northward to SR 426 (Aloma Avenue) in Seminole County.  It allowed commuters to bypass the crowded Semoran Boulevard, as well as give expressway access to the University of Central Florida.

The OOCEA began construction of phase I in July 1987 and the road was opened to the public on December 16, 1988 at a cost of $105 million, with $35 million being spent on acquiring the right-of-way for the  route.

Phase II: The Southeastern Beltway

Phase II, the "Southeastern Beltway", was considered one of the most important parts of the Eastern Beltway because motorists could use this portion to travel from downtown Orlando to the Orlando International Airport without ever getting off the expressway system. This portion of the GreeneWay had passed through some of the most barren portions of Orange County. It skirts the Econlockhatchee River marshes that cover some of eastern Orange and northern Osceola.

The OOCEA began construction of the Southeastern Beltway, from Colonial Drive to the Beachline Expressway in January 1989, and opened ahead of schedule in July 1990.  The  route cost $72 million, with an estimated $13 million being spent on acquiring the right-of-way.

Phase III: The Southern Connector
The "Southern Connector" was to become a route extending from SR 528 all the way to SR 535.  The OOCEA began construction of the  road in November 1991 and completed construction July 1, 1993, at a cost of $273 million.  It was during the construction of this section that the entire beltway project was renamed the Central Florida GreeneWay.  From 2015 through 2016, a limited interchange was completed with SR 417 and Florida's Turnpike. The remaining ramps to complete the full interchange were opened May 21st, 2021.

Phase IV: The Seminole Expressway

The Seminole Expressway, the northern leg of SR 417, is located in Seminole County and is owned and operated by Florida's Turnpike Enterprise.  The section south of Aloma Avenue to the county line (less than one mile) was acquired from the Seminole County Expressway Authority in April 1990 as part of Florida's Turnpike Expansion Program authorized by Senate Bill 1316.

The initial stretch, from just south of Aloma to US 17/92 opened in phases in 1994.  The final six miles (10 km) connect to Interstate 4 near Sanford/Lake Mary, and opened to traffic on September 15, 2002, approximately seven months ahead of the final schedule.  This leg features only one mainline toll plaza (just south of CR 427), but it is also the priciest toll plaza on SR 417 at $2.50 per vehicle. This section also features the only "free movement" on SR 417. No toll is collected for motorists traveling between I-4 and Rinehart Road (whose interchange with SR 417 is used for travelers on SR 46 and CR 46A to get to and from SR 417).

Phase V: Southern Connector Extension
Due to the multiple entities involved, which included OOCEA, Walt Disney World, Osceola County, private landowners, the Reedy Creek Improvement District, and the Florida's Turnpike Enterprise, building the southernmost  between I-4 and the GreeneWay became a complex task.  Eventually, they agreed on the Southern Connector Extension, as well as the  Osceola Parkway.

Florida's Turnpike began construction of the  extension from the GreeneWay to I-4 in 1994 and completed construction in mid 1996.  The project cost almost $153 million, with $74 million coming from contributions from the private parties involved in building this route, making it possible to get from Walt Disney World to the Orlando International Airport without ever driving on Interstate 4.

Later changes
In 2008, the Turnpike Enterprise began a $49 million project to reconstruct the Lake Jesup toll plaza, allowing for the inclusion of SunPass/E-PASS express lanes.  The project was completed in April 2011.

On December 14, 2011, the northern terminus of SR 417 was extended from Interstate 4 to International Parkway.  The $11.4 million project began construction on November 29, 2010.

The Turnpike Enterprise and OOCEA (now CFX) agreed to build a partial interchange between SR 417 and Florida's Turnpike in the late 2000s, after negotiations dating back to a 1991 field study. The interchange is being built in two phases. The first phase, built by CFX, added ramps from southbound SR 417 to southbound Florida’s Turnpike and from northbound Florida’s Turnpike to northbound SR 417. Construction on the first phase began in September 2013 and opened on January 26, 2015. The second phase, completing the interchange, will be built by the Turnpike Enterprise with construction beginning in late 2014 and expected to be completed in 2017, several years ahead of its original completion date.

Future
The OOCEA 2030 Master Plan suggests widening the entire expressway to six lanes from International Drive to the Seminole County line. Florida's Turnpike Enterprise has completed a project development & environment study (PD&E) to evaluate the widening of the Seminole Expressway, the portion of SR 417 north of University Boulevard. Construction between University Boulevard and SR 434 is currently not scheduled to begin until 2020.

In 2019, construction is anticipated to start on a new interchange between SR 429 (Wekiva Parkway), SR 417, and Interstate 4. This will complete the beltway around Orlando.

Exit list

See also
 Central Florida Expressway Authority

References

External links

 SR 417 (Central FL GreeneWay) - Central Florida Expressway Authority
Florida @ SouthEastRoads - Florida 417

417
417
417
417
417
417
417
417
417
Freeways in the United States
1988 establishments in Florida
Central Florida Expressway Authority
Beltways in the United States